Ralph Charles Beauclerk  (1917–2007), 6th Marquis de Valero de Urría, was in remainder to the dukedom of Saint Albans.

Both of Beauclerk's parents were of aristocratic descent. His father was engineer William Topham Sidney Beauclerk (1864–1950), whose great-grandfather was Topham Beauclerk, who was in turn a grandson of the 1st Duke of St Albans. His mother was Lola, Countess de Peñalver (died 19 November 1972), only surviving child of Enrique, 6th Marquis de Arcos.

Educated at Downside School and then in France, Captain Beauclerk served as a military intelligence officer during World War II.

After distinguished military service, he became a merchant banker overseas including in Hong Kong and Shanghai. In 1989, he inherited one of his Spanish family's marquessates, that of Valero de Urría; a relation of his is Esther Koplowitz, now 8th Marquesa de Casa Peñalver.

Personal life 
On 24 August 1957 at Saigon, Vietnam, he married Noirine Mary Bowen (died 20 January 1997), daughter of James Bowen, of Bowen's Cross, County Cork; they had two children:
 Dolores Mary Beauclerk (born 11 Jul 1958), married Dr Richard Makower and has three children.
 William Rafael Beauclerk (born 14 Aug 1961), ex Lieutenant in the Royal Navy serving on HMY Britannia, now 7th Marquis de Valero de Urría. His wife, since 1986, is Margaret Eleanor Mountjoy; they have a daughter and two sons:
 Charlotte Mary Beauclerk (born 24 July 1987), heir apparent to the marquessate.
 Alexander Charles Beauclerk (born 11 February 1990).
 Cameron William Beauclerk (born 25 March 1993).

Honours and decorations 
The 6th Marquis de Valero de Urría was awarded :
  : Member of the Order of the British Empire (MBE) ;
  : Légion d'honneur ;
  : Croix de guerre ;
  : Knight of Malta (SMOM).

See also 
 Dukedom of Saint Albans
 Marquesado de Valero de Urría

References

External links 
 Malraux: A Life, Olivier Todd (2005)
 www.burkespeerage.com

1917 births
2007 deaths
British Special Operations Executive personnel
British Army personnel of World War II
Intelligence Corps officers
Ralph
Recipients of the Croix de Guerre 1939–1945 (France)
Members of the Order of the British Empire
Knights of Malta
Marquesses of Spain
Chevaliers of the Légion d'honneur
World War II spies for the United Kingdom
British people of Spanish descent